Komaitrochus pulcher is a species of sea snail, a marine gastropod mollusk in the family Trochidae, the top snails

Description
The size of the adult shell of this species varies between 6 mm and 18 mm.

Distribution
This marine species occurs off Taiwan.

References

 Higo, S., Callomon, P. & Goto, Y. (1999). Catalogue and bibliography of the marine shell-bearing Mollusca of Japan. Osaka. : Elle Scientific Publications. 749 pp.

pulcher
Gastropods described in 1958